Radiation fibrosis syndrome is a human illness. It occurs as a result of cell death, and can be caused by radiotherapy. It is characterized by the accumulation of fibrin in irradiated tissues.

Symptoms
Serious cases manifest with the following symptoms: 
Dyspnea
Fatigue
Weight loss
Dry cough
Pain in the muscles and joints
Digital clubbing

Diagnosis
For the diagnosis, the following tests can be performed.

Hematic biometry
Imaging tests such as X-rays or tomography
Pulmonary function tests
Biopsy

Treatment
Pulmonary fibrosis is not currently curable; but some steps can be taken to minimize its effects, such as changing the treatment regimen. Other measures that should be taken into account are quitting smoking (if applicable), oxygen therapy, pulmonary rehabilitation, vaccination  against influenza and pneumococcus to prevent lung infections, or in extreme cases, a lung transplant. Under certain circumstances, antifibrotic agents such as pirfenidone or nintedanib can be used.

References 

Alternative cancer treatments